Killeshandra are a Gaelic football club from Killeshandra, County Cavan in Ireland.  They are affiliated to Cavan GAA.

History
In 1889 there were three clubs in the parish, Arva Davitts, Killeshandra National Leaguers and Cornafean Tom Moronies. By the 1890s the G.A.A. had more or less died out in the area. However, by 1900 it began to re-emerge. In 1901 there were two teams in the parish, Drumanery Emmets and Killeshandra De Wits. Throughout the next few years various teams in the parish would come and go.

During the 1910s and 1920s the Leaguers had great difficulty in surviving as a club. Cornafean, founded in 1908, would quickly establish itself as one of the leading clubs in the county competing at Senior Level Football.  The glamour of playing senior football with the best club attracted many of the best players in the surrounding areas of Killeshandra, Arva, Kilmore, Gowna and Lacken. The 1930s was to mark the beginning of a great era for Cavan football. The parish of Killeshandra could boast of some of the best of the Cavan team. It didn't matter whether they played for Cornafean or for the Leaguers, they were all sons of the parish and they brought a sense of pride to the people of the parish.

At an A.G.M held in the Market House in 1932 the Leaguers we re-formed and a new committee was elected. Success happened when in 1935 they reached their first junior championship final. In the final they played Crubany and won easily by 11 points to 1. The team was also known as Croghan during that period. In 1939 they reached their second Junior Final against Crubany. Croghan went on to win. As a result of this victory Killeshandra went Senior, but this lasted for one year only. This would be the last major championship win for 31 years. During the 1940s many good and loyal players served the club and from these Des Benson who won an All-Ireland with Cavan in 1948 playing in goals.

By the late fifties the club had lapsed but it was revived again at an A.G.M in 1960. By 1970 the team was back in winning form. After a gap of 31 years they again won the Junior Championship beating Butlersbridge in the final. In 1971 the Leaguers were defeated in the Intermediate final by Redhills In 1981 The Leaguers were promoted to Division 2 and also they won the Division 5 League title defeating Knockbride. 1982 Again the Club won the Division 5 League Title. In 1982 also the "Inspiration of the Club" - Sergeant Peter Maguire died in Breffni Park while the club were playing Killygarry in that year's championship. In 1982 - The Killeshandra Leaguers Pitch - "Parc Phadraig Ui Dhoibhlinn"  was officially opened in this year also. 1983 saw The Leaguers winning the Junior Championship by defeating Kill in the final. In 1984 the Club gained promotion to Division 1 and also defeated Drung in the Division 2 League Final.
 
1986 saw the Club defeat Cuchullans in the Intermediate Championship Final. This was a "Golden Period" for the club and in 1987 they finished 4th in Division 1 League Table. By 1991 they were again on their winning ways by defeating Munterconnaught in the Intermediate Championship Final. In 1992 they were beaten by a Ramor United side (who went on to win the Senior Championship) in the Quarterfinal of that year's competition. By 1993 some of this set of players had begun to retire and due to these losses the club were relegated to Division 2 that year.
The decline continued and the club were relegated to Division 3 in 1996. In 1997 somewhat of a revival of fortunes began with the Club winning the Division 3 League Title and also by gaining promotion to Division 2 that year also. The Club remained in Division 2 for years but were then relegated to Division 3 where we they remained until a youthful new team emerged from what was a "promising young underage team" to win the Junior Championship and League in 2007. This brilliant young team went on to be the first Cavan junior Team to represent the County in an Official GAA Ulster Council Championship Quartetr Final - where they comprehensively defeated the Antrim Champions Aughohill in fine free flowing style in Breffni Park, Cavan. Inexperience proved the undoing of the side when after a disappointing first half performance against "The Rock" from Tyrone this young side were narrowly defeated.

Kit
Traditionally Killeshandra have worn a yellow jersey with white trim, white shorts with yellow trim and yellow socks with a white trim.

Honours
 Cavan Intermediate Football Championship: 3
 1986, 1991, 2013
 Cavan Junior Football Championship: 3
 1970, 1983, 2007
 Cavan Minor Football Championship: 2
 1965, 1966

See also
Cavan Senior Football Championship

References

External links
Killeshandra Official Website
Official Cavan GAA Website
Cavan Club GAA

Gaelic games clubs in County Cavan
Gaelic football clubs in County Cavan